Kombo Khamis Kombo (born 15 February 1963) is a Tanzanian CUF politician and Member of Parliament for Mgogoni constituency since 2010.

References

Living people
1963 births
Civic United Front MPs
Tanzanian MPs 2010–2015
Fidel Castro Secondary School alumni
Zanzibari politicians